Obórki may refer to the following places:
Obórki, Kuyavian-Pomeranian Voivodeship (north-central Poland)
Obórki, Piaseczno County in Masovian Voivodeship (east-central Poland)
Obórki, Przasnysz County in Masovian Voivodeship (east-central Poland)
Obórki, Żuromin County in Masovian Voivodeship (east-central Poland)
Obórki, Opole Voivodeship (south-west Poland)